Stuguns BK is a Swedish football club located in Stugun in Ragunda Municipality, Jämtland County.

Background
Football has been played in Stugun since the mid-1930s but it was not until 1955 that a number of people involved in football in the village decided to form their own club.

Since their foundation Stuguns Bollklubb has participated mainly in the lower divisions of the Swedish football league system.  The best period for the club was in the 1980s when they spent a number of seasons in Division 3 Mellersta Norrland which at that time was the third tier of Swedish football. The club currently plays in Division 3 Mellersta Norrland which is the fifth tier of Swedish football. They play their home matches at the Stuguns IP in Stugun.  The ground was laid out in the 1960s and is owned by the municipality. Since 2008 the club has run the facility.

Stuguns BK are affiliated to the Jämtland-Härjedalens Fotbollförbund.

Season to season

Attendances

In recent seasons Stuguns BK have had the following average attendances:

Queens Park Rangers attracted more than 1,000 people to Stuguns IP for a friendly match as part of their pre-season training in the early 1980s.

Footnotes

External links
 Stuguns BK – Official website
 Stuguns BK – First team website
 Stuguns BK Facebook

Football clubs in Jämtland County
Association football clubs established in 1955
1955 establishments in Sweden